Leon Baker (born 17 August 1956) is a former Australian rules footballer who represented  in the Victorian Football League (VFL) and  in the West Australian Football League (WAFL) during the 1980s.

Baker started playing senior football quite late by modern standards and was recruited by Swan Districts when he was 24 years old  after playing many years of football in the country leagues including Cairns in Queensland and South Bunbury in Western Australia. Regarded as a highly skilled and fearless player he slotted easily into the Swan Districts team that lost the 1980 Grand Final with Baker playing on a half forward flank. Swan Districts went on to win the next two grand finals with Baker playing in the centre and once at full forward. Baker was awarded the 1983 Swan Medal for being the club's fairest and best player. 

Essendon Football Club then recruited Baker in 1984 where he played until 1988. A dual premiership player, Baker held down the centreman position in both the 1984 and 1985 grand finals. He came second in the club's fairest and best award for both years. Baker remained with the Bombers until the end of the 1988 season with injuries hampering his career toward the end. Swan Districts named Baker in their team of the century. Baker began coaching after retirement and has coached Gippsland club, Maffra and The Port Douglas Crocodiles in 1993.

References

External links

Leon Baker player profile page at WAFLFootyFacts

1956 births
Living people
Swan Districts Football Club players
Essendon Football Club players
Essendon Football Club Premiership players
Sandhurst Football Club players
Seymour Football Club players
South Bunbury Football Club players
Maffra Football Club coaches
All-Australians (1953–1988)
Australian rules footballers from Victoria (Australia)
West Australian Football Hall of Fame inductees
Western Australian State of Origin players
Two-time VFL/AFL Premiership players